Malkata (or Malqata), is the site of an Ancient Egyptian palace complex built during the New Kingdom, by the 18th Dynasty pharaoh Amenhotep III. It is located on the West Bank of the Nile at Thebes, Upper Egypt, in the desert to the south of Medinet Habu. The site also included a temple dedicated to Amenhotep III's Great Royal Wife, Tiy, which honors Sobek, the crocodile deity.

Palace of Amenhotep III

There are various structures in the desert, consisting of several residential palaces, a temple of Amun, a festival hall, elite villas, houses for the relatives of the royal family, apartments for attendants, and a desert altar termed the Kom al-Samak, all of which were constructed of mud bricks.

The palace was built in the 14th century BC and its ancient name was Per-Hay, "House of Rejoicing". 
Originally, the palace was known as the Palace of the Dazzling Aten. Built mostly out of mud-brick, it was Amenhotep's residence throughout most of the later part of his reign. Construction began around year 11 of his reign and continued until the king moved there permanently around his year 29. Once completed, it was the largest royal residence in Egypt.

To the east of the palace a large ceremonial lake was dug. The palace area was connected to the Nile through a system of canals, which end in a large harbour or quay, now called Birket Habu.

Layout of the palace

The palace contained many audience halls, central halls, courtyards, villas, smaller palace complexes for the royal family, and apartments for officials. The harbor and canal connected the palace with the Nile, allowing easy travel across the river to the city of Thebes, which was situated on the eastern bank. There is little evidence of this lake today and little but the foundations of the palace itself remain. 

The royal apartment featured a bedroom, a dressing room, a private audience chamber, and a harem, which, after the reign of Amenhotep III, was used simply for storage. The palace had a central courtyard, and across from the pharaoh's rooms were apartments for his daughters and son. His Great Royal Wife, Tiye, had her own smaller palace complex diagonally across from the pharaoh's. The palace grounds contained gardens and a large pleasure lake. 

Remains exist of a temple of Amun to the north of the palace, within the complex. A "desert altar" on the outskirts of the ruins has also been excavated. Remains of a temple to the goddess Isis lie south of the main palace complex.

Malqata was managed by a veritable army of servants and staff. Remains of kitchens near the royal chamber have been found, as well as servant quarters. The palace resembled a complete city, with officials in charge of different sections, such as the gardens and the different apartments and quarters.

Palace decorations

Fragments of plastered wall paintings have given archaeologists a glimpse of how the palace was decorated. Various paintings of the goddess Nekhbet made up the ceiling of the royal bedchamber. The walls were decorated with scenes of wildlife - flowers, reeds, and animals in the marshes, as well as decorative geometric designs, complete with rosettes. Ornate wooden columns painted to resemble lilies supported the ceilings. In the palace archaeologists also found some paintings of the great royal wife, Tiye. Rare traces of original wall paintings are still visible on site, despite the badly ruined state of the mudbrick walls.

History of the palace
The palace seems to have been begun by Amenhotep III in the early 14th century BC and the site was occupied as late as the Roman-Byzantine Period. Malqata was most definitely Amenhotep's main residence near Thebes, the capital of ancient Egypt, and therefore, probably his main palace in all of the country. Remains of other smaller palaces in Thebes and other cities throughout Egypt have been found, but none were as large as Amenhotep's palace at Malqata.

Malqata was abandoned by Akhenaten, Amenhotep III's son and successor when he moved the capital to his new city at Amarna, perhaps in order to break the  influence of the powerful priests of the Temple of Amun. However, it may have been re-inhabited by the youthful Tutankhamen, when the traditional religion and capital were restored and the priests of the temple regained their influence in the interwoven religion and government of Ancient Egypt. 

Tutankhamen's successor, Ay, probably inhabited the palace briefly, and pharaoh Horemheb after him as well, but by the ascension of Ramesses II, it was simply a minor residence, as the capital was moved to Pi-Ramesses in the far north.

Excavations
The palace ruins were "rediscovered" several times: in 1888 by Daressy; by the Metropolitan Museum of Art in 1910–1920; by University Museum of Pennsylvania in the 1970s; and since 1985, they have been the site of excavations by the Archaeological Mission of Waseda University.

Deir el-Shelwit

Temple of Isis
Just south of the palace there is a temple devoted to Isis which was built in the Roman period. The modern name for this temple is Deir al-Shalwi.

Roman settlement and cemetery
Excavations of the area by the Waseda team unearthed the remains of a Roman settlement and cemetery, finding remains from the times of Trajan and Hadrian.

Malkata today
Next to the site is a modern village. Here there is a tiny church and monastery dedicated to Saint Theodore Stratelates, also called Tawdros (or Tadros) of Shotep (AD 281-319).

See also
 Malqata Menat
 Aten (city), also known as The Dazzling Aten.

References
 Fletcher, J. Egypt's Sun King: Amenhotep III, 2000
 Uphill, Eric P.: Egyptian Towns and Cities. Shire Egyptology Series 8 (1988).

External links
Malkat South excavations (Waseda University - in English)
Malkat excavations (Waseda University - in English)
www.mnsu.edu

Valley of the Kings
Eighteenth Dynasty of Egypt
Archaeological sites in Egypt
Former populated places in Egypt
Amenhotep III